Baia Imperiale is a nightclub near the Italian city of Rimini. The disco has not undergone major renovations since 1985. The Baia Imperiale is one of the largest discos in Europe, with a capacity of more than 15,000 people. This number is regularly met in the summer months by the many tourists from the tourist towns of Rimini and Riccione, who often come here through travel organizations.

The disco
The disco is not only known for its capacity, but also for its large laser shows and live performances. Furthermore, the disco was built in traditional Roman style. The entrance stands out because of the enormous column of columns. Here traditional photos can be made against payment of the visitors with the entrance in the background. Also striking is the swimming pool that was built in the disco; however, this cannot be used when visiting the club. The club has four VIP sections, two of which can be rented.

Music
The music played mainly consists of house, but the club has a number of places where other music styles are played.

References

External link
Baia Imperiale website

Disco
Nightclubs in Italy
1975 establishments in Italy
Buildings and structures in Rimini